The Magnolia Hotel Houston is a hotel located at 1100 Texas Avenue, in downtown Houston, Texas. It was the tallest building in Houston from 1926 to 1927. The building once served as headquarters for the Shell Oil Company, and later home to The Houston Post-Dispatch.

References

External links
Magnolia Hotel Website

Skyscraper hotels in Houston
Hotel buildings completed in 1926